Coed y Bwl is a Site of Special Scientific Interest in Glamorgan, south Wales. The site is managed by The Wildlife Trust of South and West Wales. It is an ancient ash woodland on the northwest side of the Alun Valley and overlies Carboniferous limestone.

See also
List of Sites of Special Scientific Interest in Mid & South Glamorgan

External links
Coed y Bwl – Castle Upon Alun

Sites of Special Scientific Interest in Mid & South Glamorgan
Geography of the Vale of Glamorgan